Ziya Samedi (1914 – 20 November 2000) was a Uyghur nationalist writer who held various Chinese government posts and then emigrated to Kazakhstan.

Biography

East Turkistan / Uyghuristan
Ziya was born in Yarkend County in Kazakhstan . After having gone to Soviet elementary and middle schools, he moved back to East Turkistan, settling down in Ghulja Yining City in 1930. There he founded many primary schools to promote Uyghur education, and wrote his novel The Bloody Mountain, which attacked the Chinese Nationalist government's ethnic policy. He also rewrote Gherip Senem, a Uyghur epic poem into a play that has since been played on stage.

Samedi was arrested in 1937 by Xinjiang's governor, Sheng Shicai and sentenced him to seven years in jail.

In 1944 he was released, and joined the army of the Second East Turkestan Republic. He was promoted to a Colonel, and was made in charge of military reconnaissance until that the East Turkistan Republic occupied by Chinese Communists’ “Liberation Army” with direct military assistance by Stalin in 1949.

From 1950-1958 Samedi held a number of important positions in the Uyghur Autonomous Region new Chinese government ruled by the Communist Party, among them regional director of education, director of culture as well as the chairman of writer's association.

In 1958, however, the Communist Chinese government arbitrarily arrested him and sent to two years of re-education through labor.

Soviet Union
In 1958, he was sentenced to two years of re-education through labor. After his re-education sentence was complete, Samedi fled to the Soviet Union. From 1961, he many published novels including historical novels, among them Yillar Siri (Secret of the Years), Akhmet Ependi (Mr Akhmet), Mayimhan, and Gheni the Brave.

In the 1980s, Samedi was honored with the Kazakhstan People's Writer Award for his contribution to Uyghur literature. His books are still available in Kazakhstan. He passed away in Almaty in 2000.

Works
The Bloody Mountain
Yillar Siri (Secret of the Years)
Ehmet Ependi (Mr. Ehmet)
Mayimhan
Gheni the Brave

1914 births
2000 deaths
Uyghur writers
Prisoners and detainees of the People's Republic of China